Gullberg may refer to:

 Hjalmar Gullberg (1898–1961), Swedish writer and poet
 Jan Gullberg (1936–1998), Swedish popular-science writer
 Gullberg fortress (1253–1687), in presentday Gothenburg
 Gullberg Hundred, a Swedish hundred

See also
 Gulberg